Septimia Anne Randolph Meikleham (January 3, 1814 – ) was a granddaughter of Thomas Jefferson.

Life 
Septimia Randolph Meikleham was born on January 3, 1814, at Monticello. Her mother was Martha Jefferson Randolph.

She grew up at Monticello. She moved with her mother to Boston where she studied music. She moved with her mother to Washington, D.C., where she stayed with Virginia Jefferson Randolph Trist. In 1836, she moved to Havana. She married Dr. David Scott Meikleham. They moved to New York City. After his death, she ran a boarding house.

Works
Septimia Randolph Meikleham Recipe Book circa 1834-1887

Death and legacy 
Septimia Randolph Meikleham died on September 14, 1887, in Washington, D.C. Her papers are held at University of Virginia Library.

References 

Created via preloaddraft
1814 births
1887 deaths
People from Virginia
Randolph family of Virginia
Jefferson family